Leonardo "Leo" Carrilho Baptistão (born 26 August 1992) is a Brazilian professional footballer who plays for La Liga club UD Almería. Mainly a striker, he can also play as a winger.

Baptistão spent most of his career in Spain from the age of 16, making 178 appearances and scoring 34 goals in La Liga. He represented Rayo Vallecano, Atlético Madrid, Betis, Villarreal and Espanyol in the competition, and played a part in Atlético's league win in 2013–14.

Club career

Early career
Born in Santos, São Paulo, Baptistão began playing football for Associação Atlética Portuguesa (Santos), alongside Neymar. Aged only 16, he moved to Spain and joined Rayo Vallecano's youth system. However, he soon contracted hepatitis and had to return home to be treated by his father, a doctor; subsequently, he was loaned to CD San Fernando de Henares after the Royal Spanish Football Federation prevented him from joining his previous club.

Rayo Vallecano
In July 2011, after playing his last year as a junior again with Rayo, Baptistão joined the first team for preseason games. However, in his debut, a Trophy of Vallecas match against Sporting de Gijón, he suffered a collarbone injury; his first appearances as a senior were made with the B team in the Segunda División B.

In the summer of 2012, Baptistão was recalled for Rayo's main squad for the preseason. On 25 August he finally made his first-team debut, starting in a 2–1 La Liga away win against Real Betis, assisting Piti on one goal and scoring the decider. On 16 September he netted against Atlético Madrid but in a 4–3 away loss, adding a brace the following month at RCD Espanyol but again not being able to help his team earn a single point.

Baptistão quickly became first-choice in his first year with the Paco Jémez-led side. On 3 November 2012 he provided a further two assists for Piti in a 2–1 away victory over Málaga CF, scoring his fifth goal of the season the following matchday, a 3–2 home defeat of RC Celta de Vigo.

In January 2013, with the winter transfer window opened, Baptistão was linked with moves to the likes of Liverpool, Manchester United, Queens Park Rangers, Leeds United and Brighton, but nothing came of it. On 14 February, in his second appearance after being sidelined several weeks with a muscle injury, he closed the 2–1 home win over Atlético Madrid, only to be downed with another collarbone ailment in April, which sidelined him for the rest of the season.

Atlético Madrid
On 3 June 2013, Baptistão signed a five-year contract with Atlético Madrid for an undisclosed fee. He made his debut for his new team on 21 August, replacing Arda Turan in a 1–1 home draw with FC Barcelona in the first leg of the Supercopa de España, which was eventually lost on the away goals rule.

Baptistão scored his first goal for the Colchoneros on 18 September 2013, in a 3–1 home win over FC Zenit Saint Petersburg in that season's UEFA Champions League. It was also his maiden appearance in the competition.

On 11 January 2014, Baptistão joined Betis on loan until June. He scored in the 2–0 away victory against city rivals Sevilla FC in the last-16 clash of the UEFA Europa League, but the tie eventually ended in penalty shootout elimination.

On 19 August 2014, Baptistão joined former side Rayo in a season-long loan. In late September, in two matches separated by only three days, he earned his team six points by scoring braces at home against Athletic Bilbao (2–1) and at Levante UD (2–0).

Baptistão was loaned to Villarreal CF in July 2015, with the club having an option to buy him at the end of the campaign. On 27 September, he helped defeat Atlético Madrid by scoring the game's only goal at the Estadio El Madrigal, and four days later, against FC Viktoria Plzeň in the Europa League group stage, repeated the feat.

Espanyol
On 9 July 2016, Baptistão signed a permanent five-year deal with Espanyol. In his second season, he scored a career-best eight goals.

Wuhan Zall
On 31 January 2019, Baptistão transferred to Chinese Super League newcomers Wuhan Zall FC. He made his debut on 1 March in a 0–1 home loss to Beijing Sinobo Guoan FC, scoring his first goal on 11 May in the 2–1 win at Dalian Professional FC.

Santos

On 21 August 2021, Baptistão signed a contract with hometown club Santos FC until May 2023, returning to Brazil after 13 years. He made his debut on 4 September, starting in a 2–1 away loss against Cuiabá Esporte Clube, and finished the season with just eight appearances due to injury.

Baptistão scored his first goal for Peixe on 16 March 2022, a last-minute equaliser in the 3–3 Campeonato Paulista away draw against Associação Ferroviária de Esportes.

Almería
On 10 August 2022, Santos announced the transfer of Baptistão to UD Almería.

Career statistics

Honours
Atlético Madrid
La Liga: 2013–14
Supercopa de España runner-up: 2013
UEFA Champions League runner-up: 2013–14

References

External links

1992 births
Living people
Sportspeople from Santos, São Paulo
Brazilian footballers
Association football forwards
La Liga players
Segunda División B players
Rayo Vallecano B players
Rayo Vallecano players
Atlético Madrid footballers
Real Betis players
Villarreal CF players
RCD Espanyol footballers
UD Almería players
Chinese Super League players
Wuhan F.C. players
Campeonato Brasileiro Série A players
Santos FC players
Brazilian expatriate footballers
Expatriate footballers in Spain
Expatriate footballers in China
Brazilian expatriate sportspeople in Spain
Brazilian expatriate sportspeople in China